Sanun Tiamsert (born 31 January 1939) is a Thai weightlifter. He competed at the 1964 Summer Olympics and the 1968 Summer Olympics.

References

1939 births
Living people
Sanun Tiamsert
Sanun Tiamsert
Weightlifters at the 1964 Summer Olympics
Weightlifters at the 1968 Summer Olympics
Sanun Tiamsert
Sanun Tiamsert